Zhaojin Mining Industry Company Limited is a gold mining enterprise jointly ventured by Zhaojin Group and Fosun International. It is the largest gold producer in Shandong province, and it is headquartered in Zhaoyuan, Shandong, China.

Its H share IPO was listed in the Hong Kong Stock Exchange on 6 December 2006.

See also 
Gold mining in China

References

External links
 Zhaojin Gold Mining Industry Company Limited

Companies listed on the Hong Kong Stock Exchange
Gold mining companies of China
Metal companies of China
Companies based in Shandong
Government-owned companies of China
H shares
Chinese companies established in 2004
Fosun International
2004 establishments in China